The 59th Ordnance Brigade is a military unit of the United States Army. The unit is currently stood up as the U.S. Army Ordnance School's training brigade. In its previous iteration, the brigade had more than 6,500 soldiers. It was responsible for storage, delivering, maintaining, Nuclear and Chemical Control Orders, and supervising the weapons of mass destruction ("special ammo" of Nuclear and Chemical Munitions) for U.S. Forces and Forces of the Allied NATO-Countries, except France.

Heraldry

Shoulder sleeve insignia

Symbolism: crimson and yellow are the colors used for ordnance. The cannon barrels represent weapons, the disc at center a round of shot or ammunition, and the flames suggest ordnance repairs. The white area, suggesting a cloud of smoke, alludes to explosives. The position of the cannon barrels simulating the Roman numeral five, together with the nine tongues of the flame, alludes to the organization's numerical designation.
Background: The shoulder sleeve insignia was approved on 18 April 1980. (TIOH Dwg. No. A-1-655)

Distinctive unit insignia

Blazon: A gold color metal and enamel device 1 1/4 inches (3.18 cm) in height consisting of a red dragon's foreleg with scales outlined gold and five claws at the left, bent at the elbow in center base and having on its shoulder at right a Korean Taeguk in red and blue; centered behind the dragon's leg between a blue arch at the top extending from shoulder to claws of the dragon leg and inscribed in gold with the words "power to spare" and in base a wavy blue band terminating at the claws and shoulder of the dragon leg, a gold castle tower with red pointed roof top.
Symbolism: xrimson and gold are the colors of the Ordnance Corps. The unit's World War II service in the Central Europe and Rhineland campaigns is represented by the castle tower and the wavy band in base, and the general configuration of the tower is an allusion to ordnance materiel. The dragon leg is adapted from designs found on Korean artifacts, its five claws referring to the number of Korean campaign credits and the Taeguk symbol on its shoulder denoting a Meritorious Unit Citation for Korean service.
Background: The distinctive unit insignia was originally approved for the 59th Ordnance Group on 12 May 1969. It was redesignated for the 59th Ordnance Brigade on 8 March 1978.

History

The 71st Ordnance Battalion was activated in Germany in 1955. 1959 it was reformed into the Advanced Weapons Support Command (AWSCOM). On 24 March 1962 it was renamed as the Special Ammunition Support Command (SASCOM). In October 1972 the name was changed to the Special Ammunition Support Brigade. The Special Ammunition Support Brigade was them reformed into the 59th Ordnance Brigade.

In June 1992 the 59th Ordnance Brigade was deactivated after it had removed all U.S. Army nuclear (SALT, START, Intermediate Range Nuclear Forces (INF)Treaty) and Chemical Weapons (Operation Steel Box and Operation Golden Python) from Europe including Italy, Greece and Turkey as SETAF (Southern European Task Force).

The 59th Ordnance Brigade was reactivated in 1994 at Redstone Arsenal, Alabama and replaced the School Brigade that administratively served the Ordnance Missile and Munitions Center and School (OMMCS). The brigade moved to Fort Lee, Virginia in 2011 and the school was merged into the United States Army Ordnance Corps and School.

Overview
In June 1976 the brigade's units were situated at many locations in Western Germany and The Netherlands:

Units

41st Ordnance Company

The 41st Ordnance Company was organized in May 1936 as Company C, 1st Battalion, 32nd Quartermaster Regiment. It was redesignated as Company C, 70th Quartermaster Battalion in June 1940 and moved to Camp Gordon, Georgia, in May 1942. The company was converted and redesignated as the 3419th Ordnance Medium Maintenance Company in August 1942. The company was reorganized as the 3419th Ordnance Medium Automotive Maintenance Company in January 1943 and deployed to Europe participating in four campaigns during War World II. It was reorganized and redesignated as the 41st Ordnance Medium Automotive Maintenance Company in June 1947 and inactivated in Germany in September 1947.

The company was activated in Japan in March 1950 and deployed to Korea where it participated in one campaign. The unit was inactivated in Japan in November 1951.

The company was activated at Fort Bragg, North Carolina, in May 1952 and was redesignated as the 41st Ordnance Company in November 1952. The 41st was inactivated in Thailand in September 1966.

The 41st Ordnance Company was reactivated in September 1975 and garrisoned at Rhine Ordnance Barracks in Vogelweh, part of the Kaiserslautern military community and was assigned to the 72nd Ordnance Battalion, 59th Ordnance Brigade. The 41st provided general support on various missile systems. Their Dedicated Delivery Service program provided a direct exchange of defective missile parts. The 41st maintained two storage depots: in Weilerbach and in Fischbach where large reserves of Pershing, Hawk and Nike Hercules missile systems were stored and maintained

The company was reassigned to the reactivated 3rd Ordnance Battalion, 59th Ordnance Brigade in September 1977. The 3rd Ordnance Battalion was transferred to the 32nd Army Air Defense Command and the 41st Ordnance was transferred to Special Troops Battalion on 1 November 1982 then to the Theater Support Battalion. The 3rd Ordnance Battalion transferred back to the 59th Ordnance Brigade in June 1985 and regained the 41st Ordnance Company. The 3rd Ordnance Battalion was inactivated in October 1990 and the 41st was transferred to the 197th Ordnance Battalion.

82nd United States Army Missile Detachment

The 82nd United States Army Missile Detachment was activated in 1965 under the 512th United States Army Artillery Group, 59th Ordnance Brigade and was garrisoned at Lechfeld Air Base, West Germany. The detachment controlled the Pershing missile warheads of Missile Wing 1, German Air Force. The detachment merged with 74th United States Army Missile Detachment in 1971 to form the 74th United States Army Field Artillery Detachment.

85th United States Army Field Artillery Detachment

The 85th United States Army Field Artillery Detachment (85th USAFAD) was activated in November 1966 at Fort Sill, Oklahoma and assigned to the 2nd Missile Battalion, 79th Artillery. The unit was reassigned to the 2nd Missile Battalion, 44th Artillery in November 1968. The unit then moved to Fliegerhorst Kaserne in NATO Air Base Geilenkirchen, West Germany in August 1969 and was assigned to the 5th United States Army Artillery Group in November. The detachment controlled the Pershing missile warheads of Missile Wing 2, German Air Force. The unit was reassigned to the 557th United States Army Artillery Group, 59th Ordnance Brigade in October 1979. The detachment was deactivated on 15 February 1991.

74th United States Army Field Artillery Detachment

The 74th United States Army Missile Detachment was formed in April 1965 under the 512th United States Army Artillery Group, 59th Ordnance Brigade and was garrisoned at Schwabstadl Kaserne in Schwabstadl, West Germany. The detachment controlled the Pershing missile warheads of Missile Wing 1, German Air Force. The detachment merged with the 82nd United States Army Missile Detachment to form the 74th United States Army Field Artillery Detachment (74th USAFAD) in 1971.

579th Ordnance Company

The 579th Ordnance Company was activated and assigned to the 81st Ordnance Battalion on 24 June 1961 in Wiesbaden, commanded by Captain William H. Dodd. The Seventh United States Army Advance Weapons Guided Missile Company, located in Gonsenheim and the 367th Ordnance Detachment were deactivated on the same date and most of the personnel were transferred to the 579th; the 167th Ordnance Detachment was attached to the 579th. The mission of the 579th was to provide general support maintenance for all non-explosive components of "Y" missiles and all ordnance material of the ground guidance launching and handling equipment not allied with automotive or conventional mechanical equipment. In 1964 the 579th was transferred to the 19th Ordnance Battalion.

The 579th Ordnance Company under the 59th Ordnance Group was assigned the general support role for the Pershing in 1966. The company was garrisoned on Kleber Kaserne in Kaiserslautern. In January 1967, the company moved to Wartberg Kaserne in Pforzheim. The 579th then moved to Nelson Barracks in Neu-Ulm in a general support maintenance role. In 1977 the 3rd Ordnance Battalion was activated under the 59th Ordnance Brigade with the 579th as a subordinate unit. In 1982, the 579th was deactivated and reformed as Headquarters and Headquarters Company and D Company of the 55th Maintenance Battalion, 56th Field Artillery Brigade.

Members of the 579th wore the shoulder sleeve insignia of the Theater Army Support Command (TASCOM) until 1974, then the United States Army Europe (USAREUR). They wore the distinctive unit insignia of the 59th Ordnance Brigade until 1977 when the unit switched to that of the 3rd Ordnance Battalion.

Commanders
Major  Stanley Olsen
Captain Gene Dziedzic Jr
Major Francis W. Thonus
Major Richard A. Carter
Captain Michael C. Kilgore

References

External links
59th Brigade History
Unit History
A Return to Muenster (2012) - danscape

Training brigades of the United States Army
Military units and formations established in 1955
Ordnance units and formations of the United States Army